A duckling is a baby duck.

"Duckling" or "ducklings" may also refer to:

 Duckling (software), a collaborative software suite
 "Duckling", a 2011 episode of the TV series Louie
 Loening Duckling, the name of several models of aircraft developed by Loening Aeronautical Engineering in the 1910s and 1920s
 Lincoln Ducklings, a minor-league American baseball team in the Western League that existed only in 1906

See also
 The Ugly Duckling (disambiguation)
 Make Way for Ducklings